DVL could refer to:
 Differential Vascular Labeling, method to differentiate between blood and lymphatic systems
 Doppler Velocity Log, an instrument used to measure velocities in water
 Damn Vulnerable Linux, a Linux distribution designed for IT-Security training.
 Davitamon–Lotto, former name of the Belgian cycling team Omega Pharma–Lotto
 Dearne Valley Line, a railway line in England
 Desert Valley League, a high school sports league in Riverside County, California, United States
 Deutsche Versuchsanstalt für Luftfahrt, a German aerospace center
 Deutsche Volksliste, a former Nazi institution
 Deutsche Volleyball-Bundesliga, the German Volleyball-league
 Devils Lake (Amtrak station), North Dakota, United States; Amtrak station code DVL
 Devils Lake Regional Airport, North Dakota, United States; IATA airport code DVL
 Devlali railway station, India; Indian Railways station code DVL
 Digital Video Logger see Digital video recorder
 Discrete Video Learning
 Dishevelled, a gene family (DVL1, DVL2, and DVL3) that regulates the Wnt signaling pathway and other intercellular signaling pathways
 Pioneer DVL, a series of hybrid DVD/LaserDisc players